Powells Valley (variants include  Powell Valley, Powl Valley and Powls Valley) is an unincorporated community in Halifax Township, Dauphin County, Pennsylvania, United States, situated in the Harrisburg–Carlisle metropolitan statistical area.

Powells Valley is located on Pennsylvania Route 225 just below Matamoras.

References

External links 
Powells Valley Profile

Harrisburg–Carlisle metropolitan statistical area
Unincorporated communities in Dauphin County, Pennsylvania
Unincorporated communities in Pennsylvania